Van Goghs is a 2018 Russian  drama  film directed and written by Sergey Livnev. It stars Aleksei Serebryakov and  Daniel Olbrychski.

Plot 
The film tells about a lonely artist Mark, returning to Latvia to his own father after a long stay abroad. At home, Mark discovers many new things for himself, gets answers to questions that do not give him peace of mind all his life.

Cast
 Aleksei Serebryakov as Mark
 Daniel Olbrychski as Victor
 Elena Koreneva as Irina
 Polina Agureeva as Masha
 Natalya Negoda as Tanya
 Avangard Leontiev as Veniamin
 Svetlana Nemolyaeva as Toma
 Olga Ostroumova as Ludmila
 Yevgeny Tkachuk as Young Victor
 Sergey Dreyden as Masha's grandfather
 Anna Kamenkova as Masha's mother

Awards
Sergey Livnev's film awarded prizes of  festival Kinotavr and Russian Guild of Film Critics.

References

External links 
 

2018 films
Russian drama films
2018 drama films
Films scored by Leonid Desyatnikov
Films set in Russia
Films shot in Russia